Johannes Heroldt (around 1550 in Jena - September 8, 1603 in Weimar) was a German composer best known for his six-part St Matthew Passion composed at Klagenfurt in 1594.

Works, editions and recordings
"Historia des Leidens und Sterbens unsers Herrn und Heylandts Jesu Christi aus dem hlg. Evangelio Mattheo", mit 6 Stimmen componirt; Grätz in Steyer bei Georg Widmannstetter, 1594, Graz 1594 ; edition Hans Joachim Moser - 1955
Historia, with Joachim a Burck Johannespassion and Christoph Demantius Passion. recorded by Michel Laplénie, Erato 1990
Historia, with Teodoro Clinio Passio secundum Joannem - recorded by Ensemble Triagonale, Michael Paumgarten CPO, 2015

References

Renaissance composers
1550 births
1603 deaths